MarQuee Mall is a shopping mall owned and operated by the North Beacon Commercial Corporation, a 100% wholly owned subsidiary of Ayala Land. It is located in Barangay Pulung Maragul, Angeles City, Philippines.

Location
MarQuee Mall is located along Aniceto Gueco Avenue in Angeles City, Philippines. The mall is adjacent to the North Luzon Expressway's Angeles Exit, as well as the Angeles City Hall Complex.

Physical details
MarQuee Mall is the retail component of MarQuee, a  integrated community developed by Ayala Land that includes MarQuee Place, a residential development located a few hundred meters away as well as MarQuee Residences, a two-tower condominium right within the mall complex. The mall complex also features a chapel on its third floor as well as an outdoor park facing MarQuee Residences. In July 2012, the Department of Foreign Affairs inaugurated its second passport office in Pampanga at the mall's third level.

MarQuee Residences

Within the complex is the 14 and 8-storey MarQuee Residences. It is a residential complex developed by Alveo. It has 2 towers with one at 14-storeys and the other at 8-storeys.

Gallery

In popular culture
 The mall is featured (as Tamol Mall) as the finale scene in the 2019 film The Mall, The Merrier.

See also
 Abreeza
 Centrio
 Ayala Malls

References

External links

Marquee Mall Official website

Shopping malls in Pampanga
Buildings and structures in Angeles City
Ayala Malls
Shopping malls established in 2009